Bina Sarkar Ellias (born 1949) is a poet. She is editor, designer and publisher of International Gallerie, a global arts and ideas journal (www.gallerie.net) founded by her in 1997. She is also an art curator, having curated several important exhibits of renowned artists.  https://mumbaimirror.indiatimes.com/opinion/city-columns/bina-sarkar-the-cave-woman/articleshow/59865389.cms

Cultural Practitioner

In 1984, Bina Sarkar Ellias co-founded the advertising agency "Nucleus", with Rafeeq Ellias and worked for 12 years as its Creative Director. In 1997, she founded International Gallerie, a bi-annual arts and ideas magazine that she edits, designs and publishes.

In recognition of her efforts, she has been awarded a Woman Achiever's award by FICCI/FLO 2013, Woman Achiever of the year by TimesGroup & ITC, in 2008  and a Fellowship from the Asia Leadership Fellow Program and Japan Foundation for research and development of the project: Unity in Diversity:  Envisioning Community Building in Asia and Beyond, Tokyo, in 2007  in recognition of her work in encouraging knowledge, understanding and appreciation of cultural diversity.  She has also been recipient of the Prince Claus Awards.

Besides several shows she has curated are “Migration” at the Pune Biennale 2017. Her curation of a forthcoming show in New York, is a work in progress.

Sarkar Ellias has been invited to speak at various venues, chaired the New Moves Festival discussion with 10 Asian women artists in Glasgow as well as other fora in London, San Francisco, New York, Tokyo, Teheran, Dacca, Lahore, Karachi, Delhi, Santiniketan, Kolkata and Mumbai in the last many years. She has been a panelist at the 85th Congress of PEN International in Manila, Philippines (2019).

Poet, editor, designer, publisher, curator

Bina Sarkar soon after graduation with Honours in English at Scottish Church College, Calcutta University, began as a freelance writer to Desmond Doig's popular journal, Junior Statesman; she was employed next, as assistant editor to T.M. Ramachandran of [Film World], an eclectic Indian magazine on world cinema. She went on to be a sub-editor at Eve's Weekly, following which she contributed articles for The Times of India, The Indian Express, The Hindu and the Hindustan Times through the years.

She founded International Gallerie in 1997, an award-winning global arts and ideas journal that encourages understanding and appreciation of cultural diversity through excellence in the arts. For 22 years, Gallerie has upheld unity in diversity through artistic reflections via the visual and performing arts, poetry, essay, photography, cinema and travel stories, narratives that reveal a world that is essentially one, even as politicians divide us.

She taught herself graphic design and has been invited by artists, galleries, photographers and a poet to design their books and catalogues. To date, she has designed and edited, Fifty Years of Contemporary Indian Art, 1997, for the Mohile Parikh Centre for Visual Arts, Mumbai, 1997 . She has designed artist Jehangir Sabavala's catalogue for the 2002 show in Mumbai, Delhi and New York, artist Rekha Rodwittiya's catalogue, 2003 and recently in 2007, for shows in New York, Crossing Generations: diverge, the fortieth anniversary catalogue for Gallery Chemould, Mumbai, 2004, and a book on  artist Tyeb Mehta, Svaraj  by Ramchandra Gandhi. She has designed, edited  and published an art  book, Chinthala Jagdish:Unmasked, 2004,  and The Curious World of Chinthala Jagdish, 2008, a book of poems, Rain, for  Indian poet Sudeep Sen, 2005, Ayesha Taleyarkhan’s book of photographs:, Bombay Mumbai, 2005, American photographer, Waswo X. Waswo’s book, India Poems: The Photographs and his recent catalogue, A Studio in Rajasthan, 2008. She has edited and designed photographer, Leena Kejriwal’s book, Calcutta: Repossessing the City, 2006. And artist Surendran Nair’s book, Itinerant Mythologies, 2008.

Sarkar Ellias has curated several art shows: ‘Rain’ at Sakshi Art Gallery, Bombay,  commissioning 32 Indian contemporary artists to make works on Rain; ‘Kashmir’ at Tao Art Gallery, Bombay, where artists from Jammu & Kashmir, long-marginalised, were invited to present their works with mainstream Indian artists in an awareness program of Kashmir, its history and conflict; and ‘The Curious World of Chinthala Jagdish, a show of the Hyderabad artist and his whimsical art works. She curated the online show of international art for Pen & Brush, New York, and launched her curatorial project 'Tagore Lost and Found' with 30 Indian artists at Siddhartha Tagore's Art Bull Gallery in New Delhi, 1 March 2013. She recently curated 'Migration' for the Pune Biennale 2017. It included photography, films and poetry mounted in six shipping containers with junk art created by Pune artists in the foreground.

A poet, her chapbook of poems, 'The Room' has been published by AarkArts, UK, besides having appeared in various magazines, anthologies and online poetry sites. Her book of poems 'Fuse' has been published by Poetry Primero, an imprint of Poetrywall, 2017. Poems from it have been translated into Arabic, Urdu, French, Greek and Chinese. A Chinese edition of FUSE was launched at the Formosa Poetry Festival in Tamsui, Taiwan, 2017. FUSE has also been taught at the Towson University in Maryland, USA. Her second book of selected poems responding to art and photographic images 'When Seeing Is Believing' has been launched recently in Mumbai and will be having a New York launch in July 2019.

International Gallerie

International Gallerie was conceived and founded by Bina Sarkar Ellias in 1997, as a platform for addressing universal socio-political/cultural issues as interpreted through excellence in the arts from global regions. Gallerie encourages unity in diversity in the belief that it is culture that ultimately humanises.

Quotes
“Gallerie draws my attention to what I didn't know or what I thought I never needed to know... it is positive and passionate.”
-Mel Gooding, noted art critic, UK.

“A magnificent production as well as an especially forceful presentation.” ——Amartya Sen, Nobel Laureate, India/USA/UK

“Reading Gallerie is like leafing through the contemporary Louvre... in your living room. For twenty years, it has nourished my awareness of the evolving global art and culture
situation. It’s an honour to be published in its pages.” ——Gulzar, poet, lyricist, filmmaker, India

“I didn’t see how Gallerie could possibly be better than its first issue, but each successive one proves me wrong!” ——Adrian Piper, philosopher and conceptual artist, Germany

Personal life

Bina Sarkar was married in Tokyo to photographer and award-winning documentary filmmaker Rafeeq Ellias and they have two children; Raoul Ellias, a successful IT professional in the US and Yuki Ellias, an actor-director, who played Hermea in Tim Supple's "Midsummer Night's Dream", and has received a "Best Actress Award" from her solo performance in "Elephant in the Room", which played at the Fringe Festival, Edinburgh, 2017, for three weeks. Bina Sarkar Ellias when not a wandering nomad, lives and works in Bombay.

References

External links
 Rethinking Rain
 Roving Eye
 Bina Sarkar Ellias: Understanding Afghanistan
 Bina Sarkar (India) Gallerie
 German Authors in India
 An Afghan Affair
 Baggage of hate: Review of burning Gujarat
 Inspired Poems

Indian magazine editors
Indian women designers
20th-century Indian designers
Living people
Scottish Church College alumni
University of Calcutta alumni
Indian women editors
Indian editors
Women magazine editors
Year of birth missing (living people)
20th-century Indian women